WBYN (1160 AM) was a news/talk radio station licensed to serve Lehighton, Pennsylvania. The station was owned by Connoisseur Media through licensee Connoisseur Media Licenses, LLC. It was simulcasting WEEU in Reading, Pennsylvania, which was owned by Twilight Broadcasting. The station carried a mix of locally-produced and syndicated programming, with specialty music shows on weekends, plus live sports including the Philadelphia Phillies and 76ers.

History
The station was signed-on in 1962 by Martin Phillip under the call letters WYNS (pronounced wins) on 1150 kHz.

Phillip sold the station to Ragan Henry in 2000. Following financial losses, Henry took WYNS off-the-air on December 31, 2002; in 2003, he sold WYNS to Nassau Broadcasting Partners. Following the sale, the station, which had been an oldies station, began carrying sports radio programming from ESPN Radio, simulcast from sister station WEEX in Easton, PA. (WYNS had abandoned the oldies format in 1998 in favor of country music, but subsequently reversed that change.)

In 2005, WBYN-FM, a co-located Christian station was leased via a local marketing agreement (LMA) to Nassau, with plans to eventually purchase that station. WYNS's call letters were changed to WBYN on September 25, 2005, when the station started simulcasting WBYN-FM. The simulcast continued until the winter of 2006 when the FM station changed formats to an Adult Rock Hits format called Frank FM and call sign to WFKB. WBYN's religious format remained on AM 1160 and on WFKB-FM HD-2. Nassau continued to manage WFKB with plans to acquire it. After being unable to negotiate a purchase of WFKB or extend the LMA, WDAC Radio took back operations of WFKB on March 15, 2009. On March 31, 2009, WFKB dropped the Adult Rock Hits format, reverted to a religious format, and reverted to WBYN-FM calls.

The religious format on WBYN-FM, while similar to WBYN, was different programming. WBYN-FM focused more on national features, played more music, while WBYN focused more on talk and teaching, with some shows coming from Salem Media.

The station, along with nine other Nassau stations in New Jersey and Pennsylvania, was purchased at bankruptcy auction by NB Broadcasting in May 2012. NB Broadcasting was controlled by Nassau's creditors — Goldman Sachs, Pluss Enterprises, and P.E. Capital.

In November, NB Broadcasting filed a motion to assign its rights to the stations to Connoisseur Media. The sale to Connoisseur Media, at a price of $38.7 million, was consummated on May 29, 2013.

On January 4, 2016, WBYN changed formats back to a simulcast of WEEX. Prior to the simulcast, it broadcast a sports format and featured programming from ESPN Radio. Before that, until 2016, it carried religious and inspirational programming. WBYN was for a time inactive, after having reported to the FCC through its licenseholder's attorney the theft of copper radials and ground system of the station's transmitter as of March 4, 2018. In June 2019, the station returned to the air. In August 2019, WBYN began a simulcast of WEEU-AM in Reading, pending its acquisition by Twilight Broadcasting, which was announced in November 2019.

Due to issues related to the station's studio and transmitter site, the sale to Twilight Broadcasting was never consummated. Connoisseur Media surrendered WBYN's license to the Federal Communications Commission on October 12, 2021, who cancelled it the same day. As of June 2022 the transmitter site outside of Lehighton was dismantled.

Previous logo

See also
 WEEU

References

External links
FCC Station Search Details: DWBYN (Facility ID: 69688)
FCC History Cards for WBYN (covering 1957-1981 as WLPS / WYNS)

BYN
Radio stations established in 1962
1962 establishments in Pennsylvania
Radio stations disestablished in 2021
2021 disestablishments in Pennsylvania
Defunct radio stations in the United States
BYN